The Headquarters of the Provincial Bank of Córdoba, more often referred locally as Banco de Córdoba Casa Central, is a large bank building in Córdoba, Argentina.

Inaugurated on 17 May 1889, it is one of the first buildings especially constructed for a financial institution in Latin America and is among the most important assets in the architectural heritage of Cordoba Province. 
It was declared a provincial historic monument in 1993 and a National Historic Landmark in 2000.

History
The building was designed by the prestigious Italian Argentine architect Francesco Tamburini, who left his mark on some of the most emblematic local architecture, such as the Teatro Colón, the Casa Rosada, the Police Central Department Building in Buenos Aires; and the Teatro del Libertador General San Martín in Córdoba City.
Construction began in 1887 under the technical direction of engineer José Franceschi.

The decoration of the headquarters' interiors is inspired in the Palace of Versailles, for which a wide variety of techniques and designs were applied. Inside the building stands the figure of Mercury, protector of merchants and guilds.

See also
 Headquarters of the Bank of the Argentine Nation
 List of National Historic Monuments of Argentina

External links 
 

Bank headquarters
Government buildings in Argentina
Government buildings completed in 1889
National Historic Monuments of Argentina